Angelo Ajieng Chol (born July 15, 1993) is a South Sudanese professional basketball player for Tokyo United Basketball Club in Japanese B3 League. He played college basketball for San Diego State.

Professional career
On January 21, 2021, Chol signed with Phoenix Brussels of the Belgian Pro Basketball League (PBL).

Career statistics

B.League

|-
| align="left" | 2017–18
| align="left" | Sendai
|53 ||15 || 18.8 ||.535  || .000 ||.585 || 6.7 || 1.0 || 0.4 ||0.9  || 10.3
|-

References

External links
San Diego State Aztecs bio
Arizona Wildcats bio

1993 births
Living people
American expatriate basketball people in Japan
American expatriate basketball people in Portugal
American expatriate basketball people in Spain
American men's basketball players
Aomori Wat's players
Arizona Wildcats men's basketball players
Brussels Basketball players
Cáceres Ciudad del Baloncesto players
Parade High School All-Americans (boys' basketball)
Power forwards (basketball)
San Diego State Aztecs men's basketball players
Sendai 89ers players
South Sudanese men's basketball players